St Austell was a parliamentary constituency centred on the town of St Austell in Cornwall.  It returned one Member of Parliament (MP)  to the House of Commons of the Parliament of the United Kingdom.

The constituency was created for the 1885 general election, and abolished for the 1918 general election.

Boundaries 
The Sessional Divisions of Powder East and South, and Ryder, and the civil parishes of Ladock and St Blazey.

Members of Parliament

Election results

Elections in the 1880s

Borlase's resignation caused a by-election.

Elections in the 1890s

McArthur was appointed a Lord Commissioner of the Treasury, requiring a by-election.

Elections in the 1900s

Elections in the 1910s

General Election 1914–15:

Another General Election was required to take place before the end of 1915. The political parties had been making preparations for an election to take place and by July 1914, the following candidates had been selected; 
Liberal: Thomas Agar-Robartes
Unionist:

References 

Parliamentary constituencies in Cornwall (historic)
Constituencies of the Parliament of the United Kingdom established in 1885
Constituencies of the Parliament of the United Kingdom disestablished in 1918
St Austell